Pendleton Bridge railway station was a railway station in Pendleton, Salford built on the Manchester and Bolton Railway, between Salford and Clifton Junction.  The station was accessed from Station Street, just west of Broughton Road (A576). It was unusual in having a canal, the Manchester, Bolton & Bury Canal, running alongside the station behind the up (southbound) platform.

This station has been known by at least two names: originally opened as Pendleton Bridge in September 1843, it has also been known as Pendleton Old, and by the time of its closure on 5 December 1966, was known simply as Pendleton. The other station in Pendleton, near the church, was known as Pendleton Broad Street until Pendleton Bridge closed.

The station no longer exists.

References

Bibliography

Disused railway stations in Salford
Former Lancashire and Yorkshire Railway stations
Railway stations in Great Britain opened in 1843
Railway stations in Great Britain closed in 1966
1843 establishments in England
1966 disestablishments in England
Beeching closures in England